Roaring Fires is a 1927 American silent drama film directed by Barry Barringer and starring Roy Stewart, Alice Lake and Lionel Belmore. It is now considered to be a lost film.

Cast
 Roy Stewart as David Walker
 Alice Lake as Sylvia Summers
 Lionel Belmore as John D. Summers
 Bert Berkeley as Paddy Flynn
 Ray Turner as Dennison de Puyster 
 Spottiswoode Aitken as Calvert Carter
 George Dunning as Tommy - the Crippled Boy
 Robert Walker		
 Culvert Curtis

References

Bibliography
 Palmer, Scott. British Film Actors' Credits, 1895-1987. McFarland, 1988.

External links
 

1927 films
1927 drama films
1920s English-language films
American silent feature films
Silent American drama films
American black-and-white films
Films directed by Barry Barringer
1920s American films
English-language drama films